The name Anita has been used for thirteen tropical cyclones worldwide: one in the North Atlantic Ocean, one in the South Atlantic Ocean, two in the South-West Indian Ocean, and nine in the Western Pacific Ocean. The name Anita was retired in the North Atlantic after the 1977 hurricane season.

In the North Atlantic:
 Hurricane Anita (1977), Category 5 hurricane that made a powerful landfall in northern Mexico
The name Anita was retired from use in the North Atlantic after the 1977 hurricane season.

In the South Atlantic:
 Tropical Storm Anita (2010), the third known tropical cyclone in the south Atlantic on record; did not make landfall, but brought gusty winds to Brazil

In the South-West Indian:
 Cyclone Anita (1967)
 Tropical Storm Anita (2006), passed between Madagascar and the African continent, but did not make landfall

In the Western Pacific:
 Tropical Storm Anita (1950) (T5038)
 Typhoon Anita (1955) (T5504)
 Tropical Depression Anita (1959) (07W), Japan Meteorological Agency analyzed it as a tropical depression, not as a tropical storm
 Tropical Storm Anita (1961) (26W), Japan Meteorological Agency analyzed it as a tropical depression, not as a tropical storm
 Tropical Storm Anita (1964) (T6421, 33W), struck Vietnam
 Typhoon Anita (1967) (T6706, 06W, Gening)
 Super Typhoon Anita (1970) (T7010, 11W), struck Japan
 Typhoon Anita (1973) (T7302, 02W)
 Typhoon Anita (1976) (T7611, 11W, Maring), struck Japan

Atlantic hurricane set index articles
Pacific typhoon set index articles
South-West Indian Ocean cyclone set index articles